Boniface I (died 823) was appointed governor of Italy by Charlemagne after the death of King Pepin. He was the count and duke of Lucca and sometimes is considered the first margrave of Tuscany because of the various counties he amassed: Pisa, Pistoia, Volterra, and Luni. He was first attested in March 812.

He left a son, Boniface, who became margrave of Tuscany and another named Berard, who assisted his brother in the defence of Corsica. His only daughter, Richilda, became abbess of SS. Benedetto e Scolastica in Lucca.

Sources
Wickham, Chris. Early Medieval Italy: Central Power and Local Society 400-1000. MacMillan Press: 1981.
Dizionario Biografico degli Italiani.

823 deaths
Boniface 1
Year of birth unknown
House of Boniface